Fort Frederick (1758—1777, earlier Fort Menagoueche, superseded by Fort Howe in 1777) was a British fort at what is now Saint John, New Brunswick, Canada. It was built during the St. John River Campaign of the French and Indian War.  It was one of three significant forts which the British built on the major rivers in the Northeast to cut off the natives' water way to the ocean to prevent attacks on the British settlers (see also Fort Halifax and Fort Pownall).

On September 13, 1758, Robert Monckton and a strong force of regulars and rangers (Gorham's Rangers, Danks' Rangers and Rogers' Rangers) left Halifax, and arrived at the mouth of the St. John River a week later.  He established a new base of operations by reconstructing Fort Menagoueche, which had been destroyed in 1755, and which he renamed Fort Frederick. Establishing Fort Frederick allowed the British to virtually cut off the communications and supplies to the villages on the St. John River. (Fort Frederick (Maine) was decommissioned the following year.)

During the American Revolution, American Privateers pillaged and burned Fort Frederick in the Raid on St. John (1775).  After the St. John River expedition, under the command of Gilfred Studholme, the fort was replaced with Fort Howe to the north across the St. John River in 1777.

Commanders 
 Major Roger Morris
 Lt Col Arbuthnot
Lt Tong
 Ensign Jeremiah Mears

See also 
Military history of Nova Scotia

References 

Primary sources
 
 Moncton's journal

Secondary sources
Campbell, Gary. The Road to Canada: The Grand Communications Route from Saint John to Quebec. Goose Lane Editions and the New Brunswick Military Heritage Project. 2005
 
 
Macfarlane, W. G. Fredericton History; Two Centuries of Romance, War, Privation and Struggle, 1981
Maxwell, L.M.B. An Outline of the History of Central New Brunswick to the Time of Confederation, 1937. (Republish in 1984 by the York-Sunbury Historical Society.)
 
 

Thériault, Fidèle. Le village acadien de la Pointe-Sainte-Anne (Fredericton),''
George MacBeath, "GODIN, Bellefontaine, Beauséjour, JOSEPH," in Dictionary of Canadian Biography, vol. 4, University of Toronto/Université Laval, 2003–,
AD, Calvados (Caen), C 1020, mémoire de Joseph Bellefontaine, dit Beauséjour, 15 janv. 1774
Placide Gaudet, "Acadian genealogy and notes," PAC Report, 1905, II, pt.Template:Iii, 140, 241. N.S. Archives, III
Joseph Rôbinau de Villebon, Acadia at the end of the seventeenth century; letters, journals and memoirs of Joseph Robineau de Villebon...J. C. Webster, édit. (Saint-Jean, N.-B., 1934), 99, 149, 154.— L.

Military forts in New Brunswick